The Eagle Summit is a line of subcompact cars produced for two generations by Mitsubishi and sold by Eagle from 1989 until 1996. It was marketed as a captive import by the Jeep-Eagle sales division that was established after Chrysler Corporation purchased American Motors Corporation (AMC) in 1987.

Overview
Use of the Eagle model name originated with the innovative all-wheel-drive AMC Eagle that was introduced for the 1980 model year. Production continued even after Chrysler's purchase of AMC, but both the AMC brand and the original Eagle line were discontinued after 1988. The replacements were "badge-engineered products designed, Chrysler said, to compete with hot-selling import cars."

The Eagle Summit joined the Dodge Colt and Plymouth Colt starting in 1989 as Chrysler wound down the production of the subcompact Plymouth Horizon and Dodge Omni twins. The introduction of the Summit coincided with the release of the Mitsubishi Mirage's third generation.

The Eagle Summit was positioned as a subcompact automobile model in the product mix for Jeep-Eagle dealers. Previously this position was held by the Renault Alliance until it was discontinued following Chrysler's acquisition of AMC from Renault in 1987. 

The Eagle Summit line continued through the extent of the Mirage's fourth generation, which ended in 1996. The somewhat related Eagle Summit Wagon (which was a compact MPV) ran from 1992–1996 and was based on the Mitsubishi RVR.

The Chrysler Neon was introduced in January 1994 and was marketed by Dodge and Plymouth dealers. Chrysler officials declared that no Eagle version of the Neon was planned. This meant that Eagle dealers had no competitor to the Neon, and combined with the Summit's Mitsubishi heritage, made the line expendable.

Year-to-year changes

First generation (1989-1992)

The Summit was just a badge engineered version of the Mitsubishi Mirage. In a pairing of the Japanese-built Mitsubishi Mirage and the identical Eagle Summit to test if Lee Iacocca's theory was true regarding the preference of a Japanese to an American brand on similar cars, Popular Mechanics found that American consumers were "not sold on Japanese cars. Quite the opposite. They want to "Buy American," but the Japanese manufacturers seem to offer more of the type of cars Americans need and at a better price, and from more cooperative dealers." The Summit was originally manufactured in Japan. Starting with the 1991 model year, the Eagle Summits were also built by Diamond-Star Motors (DSM), a joint-venture between Chrysler and Mitsubishi, in Normal, Illinois.

The  of interior volume classified the Summit into the compact car class, while most of its competitors were still subcompacts. The Summit was also noted for its generous rear legroom. Sales started in August 1988.

 1990: A low-cost base model was added to the bottom of the Summit line. Added to the top was a new ES, which paired the 1.6-liter engine with a sport suspension, 4-wheel-disc brakes, and  alloy wheels with P195/60R14 tires. All models received all-capital lettering on the back.

 1991: The 1.5-liter engine output increased to  due to 4 additional valves (for 12 total). The ES models returned to  wheels and disc brakes on only the front. New was the 2-door Summit hatchback; both it and the sedan was available in base and ES trims. The manual transmission was a 4-speed on the base hatchback and a 5-speed on all others; the automatic was a 3-speed on hatchbacks and a 4-speed on sedans. All models featured a new front grille.

 1992: The Summit Wagon joined the line, and it was a completely different vehicle featuring a high roofline and sliding rear side door. This "crossover" design was actually a rebadged Mitsubishi RVR, thus not related to the Mirage-based Summits. The Wagon was available in DL and LX trims, as well as in a four-wheel drive (AWD) version. The new Summit Wagon was marketed as blending the maneuverability of a small car with the roominess of a minivan with its interior offering high seating positions and removable rear seats. It was designed to attract young families with seating for five.

 Production Figures:

Second generation (1993-1996)

The 1993 model year Summits were completely new and featured more room on the inside as well as weighing less than before. The Summit was now based the fourth generation Mitsubishi Mirage 'CC' chassis platform featuring a mutlilink rear suspension and the body was given a rounder shape. 

The hatchback body design was dropped in favor of a 2-door coupe version, while a 4-door sedan joined the Summit lineup.

The Summit Wagon, a rebadged Mitsubishi RVR was classified as a subcompact minivan, or a mini-MPV.

 1993: As with the Mirage and both Colts, the base 1.5-liter engine remained, paired to a 5-speed manual or 3-speed automatic. New was a  1.8-liter SOHC engine, whose optional automatic was a 4-speed. The Summit was offered in sedan and coupe body styles, in both DL and ES trim lines. The RVR-based minivan version, marketed as the Summit Wagon, replaced the Canada-only Eagle Vista wagon.

 1994: All Summits featured a driver's side airbag, replacing one of the motorized seatbelts. The lower-end DL sedan was rebadged LX and inherited the 1.8-liter engine, which was now an option for the ES coupe as well. The ES sedan upgraded to larger  wheels.

 1995: A passenger's side airbag on all Summits replaced the other motorized seatbelt, and ES models were renamed ESi. More significantly, the 1994 demise of both Colts left the Summit as the only remaining Mirage clone, and the cancellation of the Mirage sedan at the end of 1994 left the Summit as the only four-door offering.

 1996: Summit models entered its last model year with new paint colors and seat fabrics.

Trim levels overview

4-door sedan (1989-1996)
DL - 1989-1990; 1993
LX - 1989-1990; 1994–1996
base - 1990-1992
ES - 1990-1994
ESi - 1994-1996

2-door coupe/hatchback (1991-1996)
base - 1991-1992
ES - 1991-1994
DL - 1993-1996
ESi - 1994-1996

References

External links 

 

Summit
Front-wheel-drive vehicles
All-wheel-drive vehicles
Subcompact cars
Coupés
Hatchbacks
Compact MPVs
Sedans
1980s cars
1990s cars
Cars introduced in 1989
Cars discontinued in 1996